Jean-Michel David(1947, Paris) is a French historian, a specialist of political, social and cultural history of the Roman Republic.

Jean-Michel David's work particularly focusses on the history of Italy in the last two centuries BC, the study of political staff of the Roman Republic, the history of social behaviors and cultural practices and the construction of the exemplary and collective memory.

Career 
 Assistant at the université de Caen
 Member of the École française de Rome
Chargé de recherche at the CNRS
 Maître de conférences at the Paris West University Nanterre La Défense
 Professor at the université de Strasbourg
 Professor at the université Paris I Panthéon-Sorbonne

Principal publications
1992: Le Patronat judiciaire au dernier siècle de la République romaine, Rome
1997: 
1997: (éd.) Die späte römische Republik, la fin de la République romaine. Un débat franco-allemand d'histoire et d'historiographie, Rome, (in collaboration with H. Bruhns and ).
1998: (dir.) Valeurs et Mémoire à Rome, Valère Maxime ou la vertu recomposée, Paris
2000:

External links 
 DAVID Jean-Michel on Anhima
 Notice on the site of the Université Paris 1 Panthé-Sorbonne
 Jean-Michel DAVID – Formes du prestige oratoire à Rome video
 Le patronat judiciaire au dernier siècle de la République romaine. (compte rendu) on Persée
 La Romanisation de l'Italie. (compte rendu) on Persée

French scholars of Roman history
20th-century French historians
Scientists from Paris
1947 births
Living people